Jamia Abad (also Jamiabad) is the town of Bhawana, Punjab, Pakistan. It is located near Jhang, Chiniot road 9 km away from Bhawana towards Chiniot and 56 km away from Faisalabad.

Location 
Its location is Jhang, Chiniot road on the bank of Chenab River. It is Approximately 13 km away from Chenab River.

References 

Chiniot District
Populated places in Chiniot District